Judagadu() is a 1979 Indian Telugu action film directed by V. Madhusudhana Rao. The film became a superhit at the box office.

The film stars Sobhan Babu and Jayasudha in the lead roles. The film became popular for the martial arts performance by Sobhan Babu. The film produced by Chatterjee under Samatha Films had his son, Kranthikumar playing the role of Sobhan Babu's younger brother. Chakravarthy scored the film's soundtrack. The song Mallela Velaa Allari became an instant hit upon release and is popular even today.

Cast
 Sobhan Babu  as Vijay
 Jayasudha  as Aruna
 Anjali Devi
Jaggayya as DSP Durga Rao
Gummadi
Sreedhar as Inspector Sreedhar
Prabhakar Reddy as Rudrappa
Giri Babu as Johnny
Jayamalini
Nirmalamma
Thyagaraju
Narra Venkateswara Rao

Soundtrack

Release
The film was released on 15 August 1979. 
The film ran for 100 days in a few centres across the state. The film had a theatrical run of 78 days in Hyderabad and 58 days in Secunderabad.

References

External links

1970s Telugu-language films
Films directed by V. Madhusudhana Rao